Sajid Mir (Urdu: ساجد میر) is a Pakistani politician and Islamic scholar. He is the current Ameer of Jamiat Ahle Hadith. He was also a member of Senate of Pakistan and served as Chairperson- Senate Committee on Science and Technology.

Early life and education
Sajid Mir was born on 2 October 1938 in a religious family in Sialkot, Punjab, Pakistan. He was the relative of Muhammad Ibrahim Mir Sialkoti. Sajid Mir earned Masters in English literature from the University of the Punjab in 1960 followed by a Masters in Islamic studies from the same university in 1969.

Political career

Pakistan Muslim League (N)
Sajid Mir was elected to the Senate of Pakistan in March 2009 on reserved seat for technocrats and ulema as PML-N candidate. He was the chairperson of Senate Committee on Science and Technology. He was also a member of senate committees of Rules of Procedures and Privileges, Functional Committee on Government Assurances, Overseas Pakistanis and Human Resource Development.

Jamiat Ahle Hadith
In March 2018, Sajid Mir became the Ameer of Jamiat Ahle Hadith. In September 2020, Mir attended the All Parties Conference (APC) and JAH formed Pakistan Democratic Movement along with ten other parties. Sajid Mir came for many PDM's public gatherings and powershows. In February 2021, Nawaz Sharif contacted Sajid Mir and gave ticket for the Senate Elections. However, Sajid won his seat.

See also
 List of Senators of Pakistan
 List of committees of the Senate of Pakistan

References

External links
 Senate of Pakistan official website

Living people
Pakistani senators (14th Parliament)
Pakistan Muslim League (N) politicians
1938 births
Politicians from Sialkot
Pakistani Salafis
Salafi Islamists
University of the Punjab alumni
Pakistani Sunni Muslim scholars of Islam
Ahl-i Hadith people